Rick Worman (born October 21, 1963) is a former American football quarterback and coach. He played college football at Eastern Washington University. He then played for the Calgary Stampeders, Edmonton Eskimos and Saskatchewan Roughriders of the Canadian Football League. In 2015, Worman was hired as the head coach of the Mahoning Valley Brawlers of the Fall Experimental Football League but the team's 2015 season was canceled before it began.

CFL quarterback Ricky Ray credits Worman for getting him a tryout with the Edmonton Eskimos, while he was Ray's coach with the Fresno Frenzy.

References

1963 births
Living people
American football quarterbacks
Canadian football quarterbacks
American players of Canadian football
Fresno State Bulldogs football players
Eastern Washington Eagles football players
Calgary Stampeders players
Edmonton Elks players
Saskatchewan Roughriders players
Sportspeople from Santa Clara County, California
Winnipeg Blue Bombers coaches
Edmonton Elks coaches
Hamilton Tiger-Cats coaches
Mississippi Valley State Delta Devils football coaches
Montreal Alouettes coaches
Wilmington Quakers football coaches
Players of American football from California
People from Saratoga, California
Fall Experimental Football League coaches